This was the first edition of the tournament.

Nicole Gibbs and Asia Muhammad won the title after defeating Ellen Perez and Sabrina Santamaria 6–4, 6–1 in the final.

Seeds

Draw

Draw

References
Main Draw

Berkeley Tennis Club Challenge - Doubles